Jason Zuback (born 24 April 1970), is a Canadian golfer who competed as a professional long drive athlete. Nicknamed Golfzilla, he won the World Long Drive Championship on five occasions, in 1996, 1997, 1998, 1999 and 2006. He was inducted into the Long Drivers of America hall of fame in 2003.

Personal life 
Zuback was raised in Lethbridge, Alberta. He attended the University of Alberta in Edmonton, where he graduated with a degree in pharmacy. He worked as a pharmacist before embarking on a full-time career in long drive.

Long drive career
Zuback first entered a long drive competition in 1995 after being given the idea by playing partners while attempting to qualify for the Alberta Open. He won his first event by 50 yards. The following year, he won the World Long Drive Championship at his first attempt, and returned to defend the title for three more years. He won his fifth and final world title in 2006. He returned to win the "Masters" event, for over-45s, in 2015.

References

External links

1970 births
Living people
Canadian male golfers
Canadian long drive golfers
Golfing people from Alberta
University of Alberta alumni